Luigi Fuin (February 28, 1928 in Cologna Veneta – November 5, 2009) was an Italian professional football player.

References

1928 births
2009 deaths
Italian footballers
Serie A players
Hellas Verona F.C. players
Palermo F.C. players
S.S. Lazio players
Juventus F.C. players
Association football midfielders